Edgar T. Rouzeau (died August 9, 1958) was a journalist and war correspondent. He worked for papers including the New York Herald Tribune and Pittsburgh Courier.

He wrote about the Double V campaign, Tuskegee Airmen, Eusebia Cosme. In November 1938 he wrote about Kristalnacht. During World War II, he became the first African American accredited as a war correspondent. He covered African American members of the military in the war.

References

Year of birth missing
1958 deaths